The 2018 Shoot Out (officially the 2018 Coral Snooker Shoot Out) was a professional ranking snooker tournament, that took place from 8–11 February 2018 in Watford, England. It was played under a variation of the standard rules of snooker, and was the fourteenth ranking event of the 2017/2018 season.

Michael Georgiou won his first ever ranking title, beating Graeme Dott 1–0 (67–56) in the final. None of the top five players in the Snooker world rankings 2017/2018 at the time, (Mark Selby, Ronnie O'Sullivan, Judd Trump, Ding Junhui and John Higgins) had entered the tournament.

Prize fund
The breakdown of prize money for this year is shown below:

 Winner: £32,000
 Runner-up: £16,000
 Semi-final: £8,000
 Quarter-final: £4,000
 Last 16: £2,000
 Last 32: £1,000
 Last 64: £500
 Last 128: £250 (prize money at this stage did not count towards prize money rankings)

 Highest break: £2,000
 Total: £146,000

The "rolling 147 prize" for a maximum break stood at £10,000

Tournament draw

Top half

Section 1

Section 2

Section 3

Section 4

Bottom half

Section 5

Section 6

Section 7

Section 8

Finals

Final

Notes

Century breaks 
Total: 2

 109  Michael Georgiou
 102  Mark Davis

References

2018
Snooker Shoot Out
Snooker Shoot Out
Sport in Watford
Snooker Shoot Out